Aurora National Agricultural School (ANAS)  was established on  at Bazal, Maria Aurora, Aurora by Republic Act No. 5036. It opened to the public during the  1970–1971 school year. The High School did not stay long in Bazal, Maria Aurora, because the whole ANAS populace was transferred to a 5.5 school site in San Joaquin, Maria Aurora, Aurora in 1986 for reasons favorable to the school populace.

On Nov. 24, 1995, ANAS was renamed from Aurora National Agricultural School (ANAS) to Maria Aurora National High School (MANHS). Through the years, MANHS has been continuously serving the student populace of the Municipality of Maria Aurora. With its objective to produce individuals fully equipped with knowledge, skills and abilities to cope up with the demands of the technical world, the curriculum has been enhanced by integrating Agricultural and Homemaking Arts, thereby giving each student an opportunity to earn while they learn.

Mission
The school is mandated and committed to promote and strengthen the quality of Technical-Vocational education and produced competent, effective and morally upright citizen.

Vision
MANHS envisions to produce quality graduates in Tech-Voc Education field to contribute to the manpower resources of the locality and the socio-economic conditions of the different marginal communities.

References

1945 establishments in the Philippines
Educational institutions established in 1945
High schools in the Philippines
Schools in Aurora (province)